Monastery Nunatak is a spectacular isolated nunatak at the head of Ferrar Glacier, between Mount Feather and Pivot Peak, in Victoria Land, Antarctica. A cap of pale sandstone, with vertical walls, standing above a horizontal base of black dolerite, strongly suggests a Tibetan monastery. It was named by the New Zealand Northern Survey Party of the Commonwealth Trans-Antarctic Expedition of 1958–59.

References

Nunataks of Victoria Land
Scott Coast